Nawzad is a district in the north of Helmand Province, Afghanistan. Its population, which is 100% Pashtun, was estimated at 49,500 in 2012. The district centre is the village of Nawzad; there are 14 other large villages and over 100 smaller settlements.

References

External links
 Map of Settlements AIMS, May 2002

Districts of Helmand Province